Two Weeks with Pay is a lost 1921 American silent comedy romance film starring Bebe Daniels and directed by Maurice Campbell.

Cast
Bebe Daniels as Pansy O'Donnell / Marie La Tour
Jack Mulhall as J. Livingston Smith
Jim Mason as Montague Fox
George Periolat as Ginsberg
Frances Raymond as Mrs. Wainsworth
Polly Moran as Chambermaid
Walter Hiers as Hotel Clerk

References

External links

1921 films
American silent feature films
Lost American films
1921 romantic comedy films
American romantic comedy films
American black-and-white films
Films directed by Maurice Campbell
1921 lost films
Lost romantic comedy films
1920s American films
Silent romantic comedy films
Silent American comedy films
1920s English-language films